Otto Hunte (9 January 1881 – 28 December 1960) was a German production designer, art director and set decorator. Hunte is considered one of the most important artists in the history of early German cinema, mainly for his set designs on the early silent movies of Fritz Lang. His early career was defined by a working relationship with fellow designers Karl Vollbrecht and Erich Kettelhut. Hunte's architectural designs are found in many of the most important films of the period including Dr. Mabuse the Gambler, Die Nibelungen (1924), Metropolis (1927) and Der blaue Engel. Hunte subsequently worked as one of the leading set designers during the Nazi era. After World War II, he was employed by the East German DEFA studios.

Selected filmography
 The Mistress of the World (1919)
 The Spiders (1919)
 The Wandering Image (1920)
 The Women of Gnadenstein (1921)
 The Passion of Inge Krafft (1921)
 The Indian Tomb (1921)
 Dr. Mabuse the Gambler (1922)
 Die Nibelungen (1924)
 Metropolis (1926)
 The Love of Jeanne Ney (1927)
 Spione (1928)
 Woman in the Moon (1929)
 The Blue Angel (1930)
 The Three from the Filling Station (1930)
 Hooray, It's a Boy! (1931)
 The Typist (1931)
 The Private Secretary (1931)
 That's All That Matters (1931)
 I by Day, You by Night (1932)
 Modern Dowry (1932)
 Under False Flag (1932)
 A Door Opens (1933)
 The Country Schoolmaster (1933)
 The Star of Valencia (1933)
 Gold (1934)
 Love, Death and the Devil (1934)
 The English Marriage (1934)
 Make Me Happy (1935)
 The Devil in the Bottle (1935)
The Green Domino (1935)
 City of Anatol (1936)
 Donogoo Tonka (1936
The Chief Witness (1937)
 Wells in Flames (1937)
 The Man Who Was Sherlock Holmes (1937)
  The Strange Monsieur Victor (1938)
 Jud Süß (1940)
 Riding for Germany (1941)
 Attack on Baku (1941)
 Altes Herz wird wieder jung (1942)
 Murderers Among Us (1946)
 Raid (1947)
 An Everyday Story (1948)

References

External links
 

1881 births
1960 deaths
German production designers
German art directors
German set decorators
Film people from Hamburg